Events in the year 1903 in Japan. It corresponds to Meiji 36 (明治36年) in the Japanese calendar.

Incumbents
Emperor: Emperor Meiji

Governors
Aichi Prefecture: Masaaki Nomura
Akita Prefecture: Shiba Sankarasu then Ichiro Tsubaki
Aomori Prefecture: Ichiji Yamanouchi then Katsutaro Inuzuka then Shotaro Nishizawa
Ehime Prefecture: Tai Neijro
Fukui Prefecture: Suke Sakamoto
Fukushima Prefecture: Arita Yoshisuke
Gifu Prefecture: Kawaji Toshikyo
Gunma Prefecture: Yoshimi Teru
Hiroshima Prefecture: Asada Tokunori then Tokuhisa Tsunenori 
Ibaraki Prefecture: Chuzo Kono then Teru Terahara
Iwate Prefecture: Ganri Hojo 
Kagawa Prefecture: Motohiro Onoda
Kochi Prefecture: Kinyuu Watanabe then Munakata Tadashi
Kumamoto Prefecture: Egi Kazuyuki
Kyoto Prefecture: Baron Shoichi Omori
Mie Prefecture: Kamon Furusha
Miyagi Prefecture: Terumi Tanabe
Miyazaki Prefecture: Toda Tsunetaro 
Nagano Prefecture: Seki Kiyohide  
Niigata Prefecture: Hiroshi Abe
Oita Prefecture: Marques Okubo Toshi Takeshi  
Okinawa Prefecture: Shigeru Narahara
Saga Prefecture: Fai Kagawa
Saitama Prefecture: Marquis Okubo Toshi Takeshi
Shiga Prefecture: Sada Suzuki
Shiname Prefecture: Ryogen Kaneo then Matsunaga Takeyoshi
Tochigi Prefecture: Sugai Makoto 
Tokushima Prefecture: Saburo Iwao
Tokyo: Baron Sangay Takatomi
Toyama Prefecture: Rika Ryusuke
Yamagata Prefecture: Tanaka Takamichi 
Yamanashi Prefecture: Takeda Chiyosaburo

Events
March 1 – 1903 Japanese general election: The Rikken Seiyūkai party remained the largest in the House of Representatives, winning 175 of the 376 seats, but lost its majority.
July 7 – Momijigari, the oldest extant Japanese film, premiers. It runs until August 1.
 Unknown date – Kagome was founded, as predecessor name was Aichi Tomato Food Processing in Tokai, Aichi Prefecture.

Births
 January 2 – Kane Tanaka, supercentenarian (oldest verified Japanese person and the second oldest verified person ever) (d. 2022)
January 7 – Mori Mari, author  (d. 1987)
January 25 – Fumiko Kaneko, anarchist (d. 1926)
February 3 – Yasutarō Yagi, screenwriter (d. 1987)
February 5 – Koto Matsudaira, diplomat (d. 1994)
February 18 – Tokihiko Okada, silent film actor (d. 1934)
March 6 – Empress Kōjun, empress consort of Emperor Hirohito (d. 2000)
March 30 – Chiezō Kataoka, actor (d. 1983)
April 11 - Misuzu Kaneko, poet (d. 1930)
May 19 - Shimoe Akiyama, Japanese supercentenarian (d. 2019)
June 8 – Yukie Chiri, Ainu transcriber and translator (d. 1922)
June 22 – Jiro Horikoshi, aircraft designer and engineer (d. 1982)
August 3 – Roppa Furukawa, film actor (d. 1961)
September 7 – Kensaku Shimaki, writer (d. 1945)
October 1 – Yoshiyuki Tsuruta, Olympic swimmer (d. 1986)
October 13 – Takiji Kobayashi, writer (d. 1933)
November 3 – Shizue Shiono, film actor (d. 1962)
December 12 – Yasujirō Ozu, film director and screenwriter (d. 1963)
December 31 – Fumiko Hayashi, writer (d. 1951)

Deaths
February 18
Prince Komatsu Akihito, Field Marshal, Chief of the General Staff (b. 1846)
Onoe Kikugorō V, kabuki actor (b. 1844)
April 28 – Saigō Tanomo, Shinto priest, martial artist and former Samurai (b. 1830)
May 22 – Misao Fujimura, student and poet (b. 1886)
June 29 – Rentarō Taki, pianist (b. 1879) 
August 27 – Kusumoto Ine, physician, first female doctor of Western medicine in Japan (b. 1827)
September 13 – Ichikawa Danjūrō IX, kabuki actor (b. 1838)
October 30 – Ozaki Kōyō, author (b. 1868)

Notes

References

 
1900s in Japan
Japan
Years of the 20th century in Japan